The Shiawassee River Heritage Water Trail started as a  water trail in the Shiawassee River, within Genesee County and Oakland County, Metro Detroit, southeastern Michigan.  It now reaches 85.5  from Holly to Chesaning in Saginaw County.

Geography

The  water trail in the Shiawassee River begins in Holly, Michigan at WaterWorks Park and extends eighty eight miles downstream to St. Charles, Michigan. There are signs that discuss the trail, its history and what to expect along the trail.  Municipalities, Townships and Volunteer organizations have come together to form the Shiawassee River Water Trail Coalition with the goal of promoting the trail for paddling from Holly to Saginaw Bay.

The City of Fenton maintains a boat launch at Strom Park. From there, one has to portage around the Fenton Mill Pond Dam. The Keepers of the Shiawassee in cooperation with the City of Fenton Parks Commission has built a canoe launch in Bush Park. From Bush Park down stream, the next official take out is the Michigan Department of Natural Resources's boat launch in Lake Ponemah. The City of Linden has a take out above the Linden Mill Pond Dam and a put in just below it, with a path to use for portaging around the dam.

The trail continues to be extended every year as University of Michigan-Flint's University Outreach program and the Shiawassee River Water Trail Coalition continue to work with local governments to take an active role in protecting natural infrastructure such as rivers and streams.

History
Work on making this river a paddling resource started with Headwaters Trails Inc., a non-profit group in Holly. Through the promotional efforts of the group's president, Sue Julian, and others within Headwaters Trails, other groups along the Shiawassee River joined the efforts.

A canoe launch was constructed by Headwaters Trails in WaterWorks Park with the approval of the Village of Holly and grant money from REI. The Charles Stewart Mott Foundation gave money to build a foot bridge across the WaterWorks sluice, connecting the parking area of the park with the canoe launch. Money for the interpretive signs and the mile posts which go as far as Strom Park in Fenton was donated to Headwaters Trails by Saginaw Bay Watershed Initiative Network in 2007.

A June 2009 $16,000 grant from the Fenton Community Fund of the Community Foundation of Greater Flint in June 2009 provided signage, mile markers and launch points in a 25-mile navigable path along the waterway from downtown Fenton to Argentine Township.

Headwaters Trails acquired an acre of land along Fish Lake Road in Holly, at the Shiawassee River that it plans to turn into a handicap accessible canoe launch. It is in the process of raising money for that project that is estimated to cost $80,000.00 due to the nature of the soils and all of the considerations necessary to make the launch accessible.

Operation

The City of Linden, City of Fenton, Hope Lutheran Church, the Keepers of the Shiawassee, Headwaters Trails, and the Friends of the Shiawassee are all active in maintaining the river. Headwaters Trails has had crews each year go as far as Byron, Michigan, removing large blockages. The maintenance of the river is done using "Best Practices", only cutting what is necessary and anchoring the logs along the banks of the river. The anchoring protects the banks of the river and maintains fish habitat. In addition, tons of garbage, ranging from tires, oil tanks, bicycles, traffic barricades, drink containers, food wrappers and other discarded material have been removed from the river.

The City of Linden, Argentine Township and Hope Lutheran Church have a river cleanup the third Saturday in June. Fenton sponsors a river cleanup the last Saturday in June, every year. They have been working on a footpath along the river that they hope to extend over time to Torrey Road. The City of Linden actively promotes events on and along the river, including a flotilla of paddle crafts on Lake Ponemah, each year.

Headwaters Trails has several cleanups of the river, with the first ones in May to prepare for its Adventure Paddle along the river in June. The last one is to prepare for the Fall Color Paddle the first Saturday in October. There are cleanups starting in July and going till September.

Many conservation groups, including the North Oakland Headwaters Land Conservancy, the Michigan Nature Association, and The Nature Conservancy have acquired easements along the river to keep development away from the shores.

The wastewater treatment plant in Holly is a modern facility that releases clean water into the river. Testing of invertebrates in the river has shown that the water below the waste water treatment plant is no different from water above the waste water treatment plant.

See also
 Shiawassee River
 Tip of The Thumb Heritage Water Trail

References

External links

 HeadWatersTrails Inc.
  UMFlint.edu: Shiawassee River Trail map brochures
 Oakgov.com: Headwaters of Shiawassee River in Oakland County
 
 
 
 

Water trails
Rivers of Michigan
Hiking trails in Michigan
Protected areas of Genesee County, Michigan
Protected areas of Oakland County, Michigan
Sports in Oakland County, Michigan
Transportation in Genesee County, Michigan
Transportation in Oakland County, Michigan
Tourist attractions in Genesee County, Michigan
Tourist attractions in Oakland County, Michigan
Heritage trails